Burnsville Bridge is a historic Pratt-Through Truss bridge located at Burnsville, Braxton County, West Virginia. It was built in 1893, by the Variety Iron Works Company or Cleveland, Ohio and crosses the Little Kanawha River. It consists of two Truss spans and one girder span.   The three spans are 44 feet, 138 feet, 3 inches, and 23 feet, 9 inches. The structure is supported on two stone piers and a stone abutment.

It was listed on the National Register of Historic Places in 1995.

References

Road bridges on the National Register of Historic Places in West Virginia
Bridges completed in 1893
Buildings and structures in Braxton County, West Virginia
National Register of Historic Places in Braxton County, West Virginia
Girder bridges in the United States
Pratt truss bridges in the United States
Metal bridges in the United States